Der Marsch zum Führer is a Nazi propaganda film released in 1935. It depicts the nationwide march of Hitler Youth (HJ) to Nuremberg for the Nazi Party Rally. Unlike the earlier Leni Riefenstahl Nuremberg documentaries, it does not focus on the Party congress itself, or on Nazi leaders, who are not shown until the very end of the film. Instead, it follows HJ boys from various parts of Nazi Germany beginning their journey, camping along the route, being taken in by helpful families on the way and marching through cities in formation, saluting and carrying the swastika banner.

References

External links 
Information from International Historic Films
 

Nazi propaganda films
1940 films
Films of Nazi Germany
Hitler Youth
German black-and-white films
German documentary films
1940 documentary films
1940s German films